This is a list of aviation-related events from 1908:

Events 
The United States Army announces plans to buy flying machines.
Fiat begins to manufacture aero engines.

January–March
8 January – Count Ferdinand von Zeppelin announces plans to build an airship capable of carrying 100 passengers.
13 January – Henri Farman wins the $10,000 Deutsch-Archdeacon Prize for making the worlds first circular flight of at least  in a Voisin 1907 biplane.
17 March – AEA Red Wing is destroyed in a crash on its second flight.
21 March – Henri Farman makes the first flight carrying a passenger in a biplane.

April–June
14 May – Charles Furnas becomes the first passenger in an aeroplane in the United States, piloted by Wilbur Wright. They fly for a distance of approximately 600m in 28-3/5ths seconds in the Wright 1905 Flyer, modified with seats for pilot and passenger. Shortly after, Orville Wright flies Furnas for 4.12 km in 4 minutes 2-2/5ths seconds.
22 May – The Wright brothers register their airplane with the United States Patent Office.
31 May – Henry Farman is reported to have flown with a Mlle. P. Van Pottelsberghe de la Potterie, daughter of the mayor of Desteldonk in Ghent, Belgium. She is the first woman passenger in an aeroplane.
June – Alliott Verdon Roe performs taxiing and towed flight trials with his first powered aeroplane at Brooklands, Surrey.
28 June – Jacob Ellehammer makes the first piloted, powered aeroplane flight in Germany.

July–September
The Royal Navys Director of Naval Ordnance, Captain Reginald Bacon, recommends that the Royal Navy acquire an airship to compete with the Kaiserliche Marines Zeppelins.
The award is for a flight at Hammondsport in which he flies  in 1 minute and 42 seconds.
8 July – Thérèse Peltier officially becomes the first woman to fly in an aeroplane. She is a passenger on a flight made by Léon Delagrange at Turin. However, this flight may not have been fully controlled. See also #May and #October.
8 August – Wilbur Wright makes his first flights at the Hunaudières racetrack at Le Mans, France. The Wright Flyer used for this and later flights had been shipped to Le Havre by Orville the previous year. It had been seriously damaged by custom officials when it arrived in France and was uncrated. Wilbur spent the whole summer of 1908 rebuilding the machine and getting it into flying condition. Wilbur's flights in this machine will have a profound effect on European aviation during the following months.
20 August – Robert Gastambide becomes the first passenger carried by a monoplane when he is taken up on the Antoinette II.
21 August
The Antoinette II flies the first circle by a monoplane.
3 September – Seeking a contract to build the United States Armys first airplane, Orville Wright begins flight trials before Army observers at Fort Myer, Virginia, in a new Wright Model A flyer. The flight lasts 1 minute 11 seconds.
9 September – At Fort Myer, Orville Wright sets three world records: a flight endurance record of 57 minutes 13 seconds on his first flight, a new flight endurance record of 1 hour 2 minutes and 15 seconds on his second flight (the worlds first airplane flight of over one hour), and an endurance record for a flight with a passenger (Army Lieutenant Frank P. Lahm) of 6 minutes 24 seconds on his third flight.
10 September – At Fort Myer, Orville Wright sets a world flight endurance record of 1 hour 5 minutes and 52 seconds.
11 September – At Fort Myer, Orville Wright sets a world flight endurance record of 1 hour 10 minutes and 24 seconds.
12 September – At Fort Myer, Orville Wright sets a world record for flight endurance with a passenger (Army Major George O. Squier) of 9 minutes  seconds.
Wright is severely injured.
Photos of Peltier with the aeroplane are published on 27 September. Unofficially, it is the first flight by a female aviator.
28 September – At Camp d'Avours, France, Wilbur Wright sets a world airplane endurance record in a flight of 1 hour 32 minutes, covering , winning a $1,000 prize from the Aero Club of France for the longest flight in history over an enclosed ground.

October–December
3 October – George P. Dicken of the New York Herald becomes the first newspaper reporter to fly in an airplane when he rides as a passenger with Wilbur Wright at Camp dAuvours. The flight sets a world record for the longest with a passenger, lasting 55 minutes 37 seconds.
5 October – The Zeppelin LZ IV is destroyed by fire at Echterdingen, Germany.
6 October – At Camp dAvours, Wilbur Wright sets another world record for a flight with a passenger, remaining aloft for 1 hour 4 minutes 26 seconds. He wins a $100,000 prize from a French syndicate for making two record-setting flights with a passenger within the same week.
7 October – Wilbur Wright flies with Edith Ogilby Berg, aka Mrs. Hart O. Berg, as passenger at Camp dAuvours. This is the first fully controlled flight with a woman passenger.
16 October – Samuel Cody makes his first aeroplane flight in the UK in British Army Aeroplane No. 1.
30 October – Henry Farman makes the first cross-country flight in a power-driven aeroplane, flying from Bouy to Reims  in 20 minutes.
 November – Horace, Eustace and Oswald Short found Short Brothers, the first aircraft manufacturing company in England, in Battersea, London.
18 December
24 December – The first Paris Aeronautical Salon opens the Grand Palais.
31 December – Wilbur Wright wins a prize of FF 20,000 from Michelin for the longest flight of the year (a world record) -  in 2 hours 18 minutes and 33 1/5 seconds from Camp d'Auvours.

First flights

January–June
12 March - AEA Red Wing, flying from the surface of Keuka Lake near Hammondsport, New York. Flight distance is  but ends with the aircraft collapsing to the ground, leaving the pilot slightly bruised. This is the first public demonstration of a powered aircraft flight in the United States.
18 May - AEA White Wing
8 June - Roe I Biplane
21 June - AEA June Bug
By end of June  - Blériot VIII, undated flight of some 730 meters at Issy-les-Moulineaux before July 1

July–December
5 September - Goupy No.1, the world's first triplane
19 October - Antoinette IV
6 December - AEA Silver Dart

References 

 
Aviation
Aviation by year